Yager Development GmbH is a German video game developer based in Berlin.

History 
Yager was founded in 1999 by Uwe Beneke, Roman Golka, Philipp Schellbach, Timo Ullmann and Mathias Wiese. They are best known for developing Yager (2003) and Spec Ops: The Line (2012). The studio also worked with Deep Silver on Dead Island 2, until Deep Silver cut ties with Yager in July 2015, three years into the game's development. Subsequently, Yager Productions GmbH, the Yager Development sub-studio set up for the development of Dead Island 2, filed for insolvency later that month. The studio is working on and has released The Cycle as an early access game on the Epic Games Store, which is described as a "competitive quest game". As of January 2020, the company employs 110 people.

The company received an investment from Tencent Holdings in February 2020, giving Tencent a minority ownership. According to Yager, Tencent's investment was to help with their development and publication of their current and future games. Tencent increased its stake in Yager acquiring a majority stake in June 2021.

Games developed

References

External links 
 

Companies based in Berlin
2021 mergers and acquisitions
Tencent divisions and subsidiaries
Video game companies established in 1999
Video game companies of Germany
Video game development companies
German companies established in 1999